Marchaux is a former commune in the Doubs department in the Bourgogne-Franche-Comté region in eastern France. On 1 January 2018, it was merged into the new commune of Marchaux-Chaudefontaine.

Geography

Population

See also
 Communes of the Doubs department

References

External links

 Marchaux on the intercommunal Web site of the department 

Former communes of Doubs